Albert Gallatin Egbert (April 13, 1828 – March 28, 1896) was a Democratic member of the U.S. House of Representatives from Pennsylvania.

Biography
Albert G. Egbert was born near Sandy Lake, Pennsylvania.  He attended the public schools and Grand River Institute in Austinburg, Ohio.  He graduated from the medical department of the Western Reserve University in Cleveland, Ohio, in 1856 and then practiced medicine in Clintonville, Pennsylvania.  He moved to Cherrytree, Pennsylvania, and practiced his profession until 1861, when he retired in order to devote his entire time to the production of oil and agricultural pursuits.  During the American Civil War, he served as a volunteer surgeon.

Egbert was elected as a Democrat to the Forty-fourth Congress.  He served as chairman of the United States House Committee on Mileage during this Congress.  He declined to be a candidate for renomination in 1876.  He resumed his former business pursuits, and died in Franklin, Pennsylvania.  Interment in Franklin Cemetery.

References
 Retrieved on 2008-02-14
The Political Graveyard

1828 births
1896 deaths
American surgeons
Union Army soldiers
Case Western Reserve University alumni
Democratic Party members of the United States House of Representatives from Pennsylvania
19th-century American politicians
People from Mercer County, Ohio
Grand River Academy alumni